Chen Guangyuan (1873–1939) Zhili clique warlord and military governor of Jiangxi from August 6, 1917, to June 15, 1922.

During the 1911 Xinhai Revolution he was part of the First Army, which fought against the revolutionaries of the Wuchang Uprising, and commanded the 7th Brigade of the Beiyang Army's 4th Division. Col. Chen was among the officers to be awarded the title batulu, which meant "brave warrior" in the Manchu language, after Hankou was captured from the revolutionaries. He was later promoted to the position of 4th Division commander after his predecessor, Wu Fengling, had to step down on account of illness.

Awards and decorations 

Order of Rank and MeritOrder of the Precious Brilliant Golden GrainOrder of Wen-Hu

Citations

Sources 
  Rulers: Chinese Administrative divisions, Jiangxi
 

1873 births
1939 deaths
Warlords in Republican China
Governors of Jiangxi